Minnesota State Highway 270 (MN 270) is a  state highway in the southwest corner of Minnesota, which runs from its intersection with County State-Aid Highway 13 (CSAH 13)  in the city of Hills, and continues east to its eastern terminus at its intersection with U.S. Highway 75 (US 75) in Clinton Township,  south of Luverne.

Route description

MN 270 serves as a short east–west connector route in southwest Minnesota between Hills and US 75. Its route follows 1st Street in Hills. The highway is legally defined as Route 270 in the Minnesota Statutes.

History
MN  270 was authorized in 1949. Originally, the highway turned southward along present-day CSAH 11 and back east on a local road to pass through Steen. It was moved to its present direct routing in 1953.

The route was paved in 1954 or 1955.

Major intersections

References

External links

Highway 270 at the Unofficial Minnesota Highways Page

270
Transportation in Rock County, Minnesota